Frank Curran (1910-1985) was an Australian rugby league footballer who played in the 1930s. An Australian international representative, he played club football for South Sydney in the NSWRFL Premiership as well as in country New South Wales.

Playing career
A star schoolboy footballer at De La Salle College in Armidale, Curran played for Ballina's Rovers club before moving to Sydney. He started playing first grade for Souths in the 1931 NSWRFL season. At the end of the season he played in the premiership final-winning Souths team. It was back-to-back premierships for South Sydney, with Curran playing in the 1932 premiership final as well. In 1933 Curran was first selected to represent Australia, for the 1933-34 Kangaroo tour of Great Britain becoming Kangaroo No. 182. That season he also played representative football for Sydney, and then New South Wales. The 1937 NSWRFL season was Curran's last with South Sydney. He was selected to go on the Kangaroo tour of 1937-38. Curran became the first Australian player to score on French soil in a Test match in 1938.

Frank's son, Declan Curran, played rugby union for Australia.

References

1910 births
1985 deaths
Australia national rugby league team players
Australian rugby league players
Ballina Seagulls players
City New South Wales rugby league team players
Country New South Wales rugby league team players
New South Wales rugby league team players
Rugby league players from Armidale, New South Wales
Rugby league props
South Sydney Rabbitohs players